Rina Khan is a Bangladeshi film actress. She is known for acting in negative roles. She appeared in about 600 movies.

Biography
Khan's real name is Selima Sultana. She made her debut in Dhallywood with Sohag Milon which was released in 1982. Although she primarily appeared as the antagonist in some films, she played the part of the protagonist in others.

Khan is married to Altaf Hossain Kajol. Together they have two sons.

Selected filmography
 Sohag Milon
 Sobuj Sathi
 Prem Jamuna
 Megh Bizli Badol
 Mahanayak
 Shoshurbari Zindabad
 Porena Chokher Polok
 16 Ana Prem
 Daag Hridoye
 Swatta

References

External links

Living people
Bangladeshi film actresses
Year of birth missing (living people)